Lover.ly is a virtual wedding planner and media platform that allows brides, grooms, and enthusiasts to discover wedding ideas, receive tips, purchase wedding products, evaluate whom to hire for their weddings, and share their findings. Their virtual wedding planning app uses AI and chat technology to service their customers. They have a database of editorial content that  uses a proprietary tagging program to aggregate content from wedding blogs, wedding magazines, as well as retailers, brands and vendors, creating relevant searchable content. Lover.ly was launched in 2012 in New York City.

History
Kellee Khalil, the company's founder and chief executive officer, was inspired to design the wedding discovery engine after helping to plan her sister's wedding. Khalil says of the experience "I was 40 pages deep in a search on Google, then if I found what I wanted I'd drag it over to another page, then start e-mailing links. It was kind of a nightmare," she says. "And I figured, if it's this hard for me, what's a bride in Wisconsin who may be on a budget and has no sister to give up her life for 12 months to help going to do?"  Khalil officially launched Lover.ly on Valentine's Day of 2012.

Kellee moved to New York and launched Lover.ly with a mission to provide an all-in-one resource where couples could discover wedding ideas, shop designers, organize events details, and hire their wedding day team.

How it works
Lover.ly offers a searchable database of aggregated content from blogs, magazines, retailers, and brands, and provides wedding planning tips from its own wedding editorial experts. Once on Lover.ly, users can search by keyword, category, or color, and as of 2013, hundreds of thousands images were available to browse on the site. As part of Lover.ly's commerce functionality, users can also purchase items that they discover.

During a 2013 interview in USA Today's Change Agent column, Khalil said that "the idea [of Lover.ly] is simply that your wedding binder lives in the cloud... I'm building this for my generation of brides. For us, it's all about the visual web, whether you're on a computer, tablet, or your phone."

Retail partners
Lover.ly has partnered with retail brands such as Nordstrom, Minted, Etsy, and Anthropologie. Through these partnerships, brands can raise awareness, syndication, and sales, while users can more easily access content and make purchases. As of August 2013, Lover.ly has 250,000 shoppable products from 2,000 brands on site that appear alongside a collection of wedding related images.

Monetization
Lover.ly utilizes four primary monetization methods.

Editorial blog network, native advertising, email, and events
Lover.ly works with its blog partners to implement monetized display sponsored content campaigns, allowing brands to reach a larger audience than traditionally possible. As of December 2013, the company is testing category sponsorships and CPA (cost per acquisition) ad models.

Lover.ly offers native advertising on its website, allowing brands to introduce their content to Lover.ly's audience in the context of Lover.ly's "inspiration made actionable" environment.

In addition to display advertising and web traffic, Lover.ly utilizes email marketing campaigns to drive its monetization efforts.

Lover.ly also partners with brands to reach brides, grooms and wedding attendees in offline environments. Lover.ly partnered with BaubleBar and executed a pop-up shop in SoHo and partnered with Donna Morgan to hold a secret soiree for industry insiders at the Ace Hotel.

Developments
In February 2012 Lover.ly raised $500,000 from Joanne Wilson, Michael Edwards, Michael Yavonditte, Charles Smith, Anu Duggal, Jordan Levy, and Rick Webb.

In January 2013, Lover.ly unveiled a new version of its website and branding strategy. When asked about the overhaul, the company's CEO was quoted as saying that Lover.ly was "leaning towards becoming a lot more sophisticated, more modern and more tech-centric."

In August 2013, Lover.ly launched a new "Popular" tab which lets users see exactly what's trending on the site in real time, giving brides and grooms a new way to uncover content.

In 2013 Lover.ly released an updated iOS7 application in an effort to further optimize the platform given that 30 percent of the company’s overall traffic, and 60 percent of its total engagement, happens in its mobile app. As of December 2013, the iPhone application had garnered 75,000 downloads.

In 2016 Loverly launched the first ever virtual wedding planning iOS application offering couples a wedding concierge service. Through the Loverly Weddings app, couples can plan their wedding by chatting with a Loverly wedding concierge in Loverly HQ. Wedding planning packages start at a flat fee of $49.

References

External links
 Lover.ly official website

Online companies of the United States
Wedding industry
Social planning websites